Starošince is a village in the Municipality of Kidričevo in northeastern Slovenia. The area is part of the traditional region of Styria. It is now included with the rest of the municipality in the Drava Statistical Region.

The village chapel is dedicated to Saint Mary and belongs to the Parish of Cirkovce. It dates to the early 20th century.

References

External links
Starošince on Geopedia

Populated places in the Municipality of Kidričevo